Kasimedu Govindan is a 2008 Tamil language drama film written and directed by Ramesh Sanjay. The film stars Ranjith and newcomer Karishma in lead roles, with Manish Kumar, Nakshatra, Naga Kannan, Pattinapakkam Jayaram, Srikanth, Suryakanth, Balu Anand, King Kong, Ajay Kapoor playing supporting roles. The film, produced by S. Sundaram, was released on 10 October 2008 after many delays.

Plot

In a remote village, Parvathi (Karishma) is an innocent young woman from an orthodox brahmin family. She falls in love with a Muslim man (Manish Kumar) and she even loses her virginity to him. They decide to elope and come to Chennai. The news of Parvathi eloping with her lover spreads like fire thus it tarnished the reputation of her family and her family committed suicide. Her lover turns out to be a member of a terrorist organisation and the police encounter him. In Chennai, with no home and no money, Parvathi becomes vulnerable and many people tried to rape her. The rogue Govindan (Ranjith) who works for the drug lords (Naga Kannan and Pattinapakkam Jayaram) comes to her rescue, hence she stays with him for some time at the beach. Govindan then gets into a fight with other rogues and Parvathi is wounded in the process. The prostitute Kannagi (Nakshatra) with a heart of gold takes a wounded Parvathi at her home and accommodates her.

Thereafter, Govindan is caught by the police and sentenced to jail for a short period. On his release from the jail, he decides to become a good man and dreams to marry Parvathi. In the meantime, Kannagi is killed in a car accident and the innocent Parvathi is arrested for prostitution. Govindan and Parvathi eventually meet each other after a long time, and they fall in love with each other. Govindan becomes a fisherman and the lovers decide to get married but the drug lords want Govindan to work for them and an angry Govindan humiliates them. The drug lords then shoot Govindan to death and they try to rape Parvathi but Parvathi disarms them and shoots them to death.

Cast

Ranjith as Govindan
Karishma as Parvathi
Manish Kumar
Nakshatra as Kannagi
Naga Kannan
Pattinapakkam Jayaram
Srikanth as Jail Warden
Suryakanth as Fisherman
Balu Anand as Vedi Muthu
King Kong as Govindan's friend
Ajay Kapoor as Josh
Rajakrishna
Ravibharath
Govindan
Lokesh
Balraj
Ghose
Vijaya Paatti as Parvathi's grandmother
Nikla

Production
Ramesh Sanjay began work on the production of a film titled Nearupoo in the early 2000s and the title was changed to Kasimedu Govindan in 2004. Ranjith signed to play the role of a rogue while Karishma (Poorvaja) was selected to play the heroine. Naga Kannan, Pattinapakkam Jayaram, Suryakanth and King Kong were cast to play supporting roles. Soundaryan composed the music, S. R. Ravi also took care of camera work and D. Udaya Shankar was the film editor.

Soundtrack

The soundtrack was composed by Soundaryan. The soundtrack, released in 2001, features 5 tracks with lyrics written by Soundaryan, Snehan and Kathiravan.

References

2008 films
2000s Tamil-language films
Indian drama films
Films shot in Chennai
Films set in Chennai
2008 directorial debut films